Virlogeux is a surname. Notable people with the surname include:

Henri Virlogeux (1924–1995), French actor
Michel Virlogeux (born 1946), French structural engineer

French-language surnames